Stanley Gordon Long (November 6, 1929 in Owen Sound, Ontario – January 10, 1982 in Strathroy, Ontario) is a Canadian retired professional ice hockey defenceman who played three games in the National Hockey League for the Montreal Canadiens.

External links

1929 births
1982 deaths
Canadian ice hockey defencemen
Sportspeople from Owen Sound
Montreal Canadiens players
Ice hockey people from Ontario